Derre Kwee (born 7 September 1994) is a Dutch professional footballer who currently plays as a right back for Dutch club AFC. He formerly played for Jong FC Twente and FC Emmen.

References

External links
 Voetbal International profile 
 

1994 births
Living people
Dutch footballers
FC Twente players
FC Emmen players
Amsterdamsche FC players
Eerste Divisie players
Tweede Divisie players
People from Losser
Quick '20 players
Association football fullbacks
Footballers from Overijssel
Jong FC Twente players